Gaurav S. Bajaj (born 16 November 1990) is an Indian television actor. He is best known for portraying Daksh Patwardhan in Sapnon Se Bhare Naina which was aired on Star Plus. He appeared in the popular drama series Uttaran as Aman Verma. He has also appeared in some other television series like Kaisa Yeh Ishq Hai... Ajab Sa Risk Hai, Piya Rangrezz, and Choti Sarrdaarni.

Personal Life 
Gaurav tied the knot with Sakshi Shhorwani on December 10, 2013. They welcomed their first child after six years of marriage. They named their son Vyom.

Filmography

Television

Web series

Music video

Awards

References

External links

Indian male television actors
Living people
Place of birth missing (living people)
1990 births